The 2017 Liga de Elite was the 45th season of the Liga de Elite, the top Macanese professional league for association football clubs,  since its establishment in 1973. The season began on 13 January 2017 and ended on 2 July 2017.

League table

See also
2017 Taça de Macau

References

External links
Macau Football Association 

Campeonato da 1ª Divisão do Futebol seasons
Macau
1